Créteil–Université is a station on line 8 of the Paris Métro in the commune of Créteil. It is on the surface.

The station opened on 10 September 1974 with the extension of the line from Créteil–L'Échat to Créteil–Préfecture. Its name refers to the nearby Paris 12 Val de Marne University.

Station layout

References
Roland, Gérard (2003). Stations de métro. D’Abbesses à Wagram. Éditions Bonneton.

Paris Métro stations in Créteil
Railway stations in France opened in 1974

de:Créteil – Préfecture (Métro Paris)